Lago Santo or Lake Santo may refer to:

Santo Lake (Modena), Emilia-Romagna, Italy
Santo Lake (Parma), Emilia-Romagna, Italy